The extinction cross is an optical phenomenon that is seen when trying to extinguish a laser beam or non-planar white light using crossed polarizers. Ideally, crossed (90° rotated) polarizers block all light, since light which is polarized along the polarization axis of the first polarizer is perpendicular to the polarization axis of the second. When the beam is not perfectly collimated, however, a characteristic fringing pattern is produced.

See also
Polarization (waves)

Further reading

 Mineralogy notes 6 See "6.3.5. Review of Uniaxial Optical Properties"
 Nikon MicroscopyU See Figure 1a

Polarization (waves)
Optical phenomena